Eriophyton is a genus of plants in the  Lamiaceae, first described in 1830. Its species are native to Central Asia, western China, and the Himalayas.

Species
Eriophyton nepalense (Hedge) Ryding - Nepal
Eriophyton rhomboideum (Benth.) Ryding - Tibet, Xinjiang, Kyrgyzstan, Tajikistan, Afghanistan, Pakistan, Himalayas of northern India
Eriophyton staintonii (Hedge) Ryding - Nepal
Eriophyton sunhangii Bo Xu, Zhi M.Li & Boufford - Tibet
Eriophyton tuberosum (Hedge) Ryding - Tibet, Nepal
Eriophyton wallichii Benth. - Himalayas, Nepal, Bhutan, Qinghai, Sichuan, Tibet, Yunnan

References

Lamiaceae
Lamiaceae genera